Kenroy Da Costa Williams (born 9 August 1984) is a cricketer who has represented the West Indies at A team level. An all-rounder, he is known as an aggressive and powerful right-handed batsman who bowls right-arm offbreak.

In May 2018, he was selected to play for the Jamaica national cricket team in the Professional Cricket League draft, ahead of the 2018–19 season.

References

External links
 

Barbadian cricketers
Barbados cricketers
1984 births
Living people
West Indies B cricketers
Jamaica cricketers